CITYVIEW is an alternative newspaper in the Des Moines, Iowa, area.

History
The publication now known as Cityview has its roots in The Skywalker, a biweekly newspaper founded in 1983. Named for the city's iconic skywalk system, the startup publication was quickly purchased by Business Publications, publisher of the Business Record, a business-themed weekly started in 1981.

After nearly a decade under the ownership of Business Publications, owner Connie Wimer decided to launch a new weekly, aimed at transforming the paper in what was viewed as a conservative market. Cityview published its first edition in July 1992.

In the early 2000s, a rival alternative weekly known as Pointblank. In 2003, it was acquired by Greater Des Moines Publishing Co. (GDMPC), a wholly owned subsidiary of New West Newspapers Inc., whose primary owners were Gary Gerlach and Michael Gartner. In 2004, GDMPC purchased Cityview and merged the publication with Pointblank. The name of the older, better-established paper was retained as the name of the merged publications under its new company, Big Green Umbrella Media.

Features
Cityview is known for its coverage of local restaurants, bars, and music. The paper includes columns by Gartner and by Carroll Daily Times Herald publisher Douglas Burns.

References

External links

Official Site of Big Green Umbrella Media

Alternative weekly newspapers published in the United States
Free newspapers
Publications established in 1992
Mass media in Des Moines, Iowa